Author! Author! is the only studio album by the Scottish post-punk band Scars. It was released in 1981.

Track listing
All tracks composed by Scars; except where indicated

Side A

Side B

2007 reissue
In 2007 the album was reissued on CD. Besides the original ten songs, it also contained the bonus songs most of which had been released on singles and an EP in 1980 and 1981.

Track listing

Personnel
Scars
Robert King - vocals
Paul Research - electric guitar, piano, backing vocals
John Mackie - bass guitar, backing vocals
Stephen McLaughlin - drums, percussion
with:
Bobby Charm, Julz Sale, Laurence Diana, Robert Blamire - backing vocals

External links
 Author! Author! at Discogs

1981 debut albums
Scars (band) albums
Charisma Records albums